Castro Caldelas is a municipality in Ourense, in the Galicia region of northwestern Spain. It is located to the very north of the province.

Its area is 87,6 km2. Castro Caldelas is divided into 16 areas and 86 entities of population, with a population of 1,313 (INE 2016).

Its residents are called .

History

References  

Municipalities in the Province of Ourense